Lingnan University can refer to two separate establishments:

Lingnan University (Guangzhou) - a university in Guangzhou, Guangdong province in China
Lingnan University (Hong Kong) - a university in Hong Kong